Joseph Aloysius Donnelly (born in Belfast, date unknown; date of death unknown) was an Irish cricketer. He played just once for the Ireland cricket team, a first-class match against Scotland in July 1914.

References

Year of birth missing
Year of death missing
Irish cricketers
Cricketers from Belfast
Cricketers from Northern Ireland